Tamolanica tamolana, common name New Guinea shield mantis, is a species of praying mantis native to New Guinea.

See also
List of mantis genera and species

References

Mantidae
Insects of New Guinea
Mantodea of Asia
Mantodea of Oceania
Endemic fauna of Papua New Guinea
Insects of Western New Guinea
Insects described in 1923